Lisa Eichhorn (born February 4, 1952) is an American actress, writer and producer.  She made her film debut in 1979 in the John Schlesinger film Yanks, for which she received two Golden Globe nominations. Her international career has included film, theatre and television.

Early life
Lisa Warren Eichhorn was born in Glens Falls, New York, on February 4, 1952, to Dorothy Elizabeth Golly and Frank Warren Eichhorn, and shortly thereafter moved to Westbury, Long Island, with her older brother and two half-sisters. In 1958, the family moved to Reading, Pennsylvania, where Eichhorn later attended Mt. Penn High School. At the end of her junior year, she left to study in Svolvær, Norway, as a Rotary International Exchange student, and graduated from Mt. Penn in absentia in 1970.

Eichhorn began college at Queen's University at Kingston, Ontario, taking a wide range of subjects. She quickly realized that her passion was drama and English, and these subjects became her focus. She left Ontario after two years to study at St. Peter's College, Oxford, on a year-long Rotary International Ambassadorial Scholarship, though this was not as an admitted member of the university in Statu Pupillari.

Career

Early career
Upon graduating from RADA in 1977, Eichhorn immediately began rehearsals for the Queen's Theatre, Hornchurch, playing Ophelia in Hamlet. This was followed by a wide range of regional work, including Stop the World - I Want to Get Off for the Queen's Theatre, Rosalind in As You Like It at the Bolton Octagon, The Wings of the Dove for the BBC, and The Fatal Weakness opposite Elaine Stritch at the Theatre Royal, Windsor.

In December 1977, Eichhorn met with John Schlesinger for the role of Lancashire shop-girl Jean Moreton in his wartime romance, Yanks. She convinced him she was British and he gave her a screen test and, subsequently, the part. Although Eichhorn then felt duty-bound to tell Schlesinger she was actually American, he insisted that she was his choice regardless of her nationality. Eichhorn won two Golden Globe nominations for her performance in Yanks: Best Actress and Best New Star.

The day after filming wrapped on Yanks, Eichhorn flew to Boston to play Gertrude Wentworth in Merchant-Ivory's The Europeans, for which she won a BAFTA nomination for Best Supporting Actress.

Eichhorn made a handful of London television appearances, then moved to Hollywood where she collaborated with actor Treat Williams on her first American film, Why Would I Lie? (originally titled The Fabricator).  Around this time, Ivan Passer and Paul Gurian enlisted Eichhorn to play Maureen (Mo) Cutter in Cutter's Way (previously Cutter and Bone) with Jeff Bridges and John Heard.  Eichhorn's performance as Alex Cutter's wistful, alcoholic wife was deemed "the most underrated performance of the decade" by the American Film Institute and earned her the Best Actress Award (American division) at the Deauville Film Festival.

In 1980, Eichhorn was cast opposite Gene Hackman in the low-budget Universal feature, All Night Long.  Barbra Streisand's then-agent, Sue Mengers, wanted a bigger outing for her husband, director Jean-Claude Tramont, and persuaded him to replace Eichhorn with Streisand on the film: three weeks into principal photography Eichhorn was fired from the project.

In the summer, Eichhorn travelled to Poland to shoot the CBS/TimeLife venture The Wall for Harry Sherman.  She moved to Connecticut for the birth of her daughter in 1981, then returned to L.A. to play Margaret in The Hasty Heart opposite Kurt Russell.  

Eichhorn's film work at this time included Wildrose and Opposing Force in L.A. and East Lynne, with Martin Shaw, and The Weather in the Streets, with Michael York and Joanna Lumley, for the BBC in London.

In 1984, Eichhorn starred in Golden Boy at the Royal National Theatre, London.  She made her New York theatre debut opposite Nathan Lane in The Common Pursuit in 1986, while playing Elizabeth Carlyle on All My Children for a year.

Eichhorn was invited to be a Life Member of the Actors Studio in 1988.  She shot the film Moon 44 for Roland Emmerich in Germany, then began a fruitful association with the Royal Exchange Theatre in Manchester, England, in Alex Finlayson's award-winning Winding the Ball, under the direction of Greg Hersov.

1990s

In 1990, Eichhorn made her Broadway debut at the Belasco Theatre in The Speed of Darkness, with Len Cariou, Stephen Lang and Robert Sean Leonard.  She went on to star opposite Sada Thompson and Justin Kirk in Any Given Day at the Longacre Theatre, and in the film A Modern Affair opposite Stanley Tucci.

In 1996, Eichhorn returned to Los Angeles for her daughter's high school career.  She starred in two more Hersov-Finlayson collaborations at the Royal Exchange Manchester: Tobaccoland and Misfits, in which she played Marilyn Monroe.  She returned to New York in 2000 to do a variety of theatre, television and teaching.

2000s

In 2003, Eichhorn moved back to London to pursue writing and producing.  She returned to the Royal Exchange Manchester in 2004 to play Ouisa in Six Degrees of Separation, and played Joy Gresham opposite Julian Glover's C.S. Lewis in Shadowlands at Salisbury Playhouse.

In London, Eichhorn worked in theatre (Women of Lockerbie, Enduring Freedom) and television (Spooks, Midsomer Murders, Inspector Morse, Cracker).

In 2007, Eichhorn produced and co-wrote Defenders of Riga, which was the official Latvian film entry to the 2009 Academy Awards.

Filmography

Production credits

Awards and nominations

References

External links

1952 births
Living people
20th-century American actresses
21st-century American actresses
Actresses from New York (state)
Actresses from Pennsylvania
Alumni of St Peter's College, Oxford
Alumni of RADA
American expatriates in England
American film actresses
American stage actresses
American television actresses
Actors from Reading, Pennsylvania
People from Westbury, New York
Queen's University at Kingston alumni
Writers from Reading, Pennsylvania